The Slovenian Handball Cup is the top knockout tournament of Slovenian handball. The most successful clubs are Celje (men's) and Krim (women's) with 21 and 27 titles, respectively. The inaugural edition was held in the 1991–92 season.

Men's

Women's

1991–92 Olimpija
1992–93 Krim
1993–94 Krim
1994–95 Krim
1995–96 Krim
1996–97 Krim
1997–98 Olimpija
1998–99 Krim
1999–2000 Krim
2000–01 Krim
2001–02 Krim
2002–03 Krim
2003–04 Krim
2004–05 Krim
2005–06 Krim
2006–07 Krim
2007–08 Krim
2008–09 Krim
2009–10 Krim
2010–11 Krim
2011–12 Krim
2012–13 Krim
2013–14 Krim
2014–15 Krim
2015–16 Krim
2016–17 Krim
2017–18 Krim
2018–19 Krim
2019–20 No winners (COVID-19 pandemic)
2020–21 Not played
2021–22 Krim

External links
Handball Federation of Slovenia

Handball competitions in Slovenia
1991 establishments in Slovenia